The 2017 New York City borough president elections were held on November 7, 2017 to elect the presidents of each of the five boroughs in New York City. They coincided with other city elections, including for mayor, public advocate, and city council.

All five incumbents were re-elected, and Democrats won all boroughs except for Staten Island.

Summary

Manhattan 
Incumbent Democrat Gale Brewer ran for re-election to a second term.

Bronx 
Incumbent Democrat Rubén Díaz Jr. ran for re-election to a third term. He was the only incumbent president to face primary challengers, with the primary being held on September 12.

Democratic primary

General election

Brooklyn 
Incumbent Democrat Eric Adams ran for re-election to a second term.

Reform primary

General election

Queens 
Incumbent Democrat Melinda Katz ran for re-election to a second term.

Staten Island 
Incumbent Republican James Oddo ran for re-election to a second term.

Notes

References 

New York City Borough President
Borough President 2017
Election 2017
New York City Borough President